Denis Viktorovic Kaliberda (also transliterated Denys Viktorovich Kaliberda, born 24 June 1990) is a German volleyball player of Ukrainian origins, member of the Germany men's national volleyball team, bronze medallist of the 2014 World Championship. He was part of the German 2012 Olympic men's national volleyball team.

Personal life
His father Viktor Kaliberda is a former volleyball player, member of the Ukraine men's national volleyball team.

Sporting achievements

Clubs
 National championships
 2009/2010  German Cup, with Generali Unterhaching
 2009/2010  German Championship, with Generali Unterhaching
 2010/2011  German Cup, with Generali Unterhaching
 2011/2012  German Championship, with Generali Unterhaching
 2013/2014  Italian Cup, with Copra Elior Piacenza
 2013/2014  Italian Championship, with Copra Elior Piacenza
 2015/2016  Italian Championship, with Sir Safety Perugia
 2016/2017  Italian Cup, with Cucine Lube Civitanova
 2016/2017  Italian Championship, with Cucine Lube Civitanova
 2018/2019  Italian SuperCup, with Modena Volley

Youth national team
 2008  CEV U20 European Championship

Individual awards
 2017: CEV European Championship – Best Outside Spiker

References

External links
 
 Denys Viktorovic Kaliberda at LegaVolley.it
 Denys Kaliberda at PlusLiga.pl
 
 
 
 Denis Kaliberda at Volleybox.net
 Denis Kaliberda Viktorovic at WorldofVolley.com

1990 births
Living people
Sportspeople from Poltava
Ukrainian emigrants to Germany
German men's volleyball players
Olympic volleyball players of Germany
German expatriate sportspeople in Italy
Expatriate volleyball players in Italy
German expatriate sportspeople in Poland
Expatriate volleyball players in Poland
German expatriate sportspeople in Turkey
Expatriate volleyball players in Turkey
Volleyball players at the 2012 Summer Olympics
Volleyball players at the 2015 European Games
European Games medalists in volleyball
European Games gold medalists for Germany
Jastrzębski Węgiel players
Ziraat Bankası volleyball players
Modena Volley players